Oleksandr Serhiyovych Hushchyn (born 5 August 1966) is a retired Ukrainian professional footballer.

Honours
 Soviet Top League champion: 1985.

1966 births
Living people
Soviet footballers
Soviet expatriate footballers
Ukrainian footballers
Ukrainian expatriate footballers
Expatriate footballers in Hungary
Expatriate footballers in Finland
Expatriate footballers in Russia
Ukrainian Premier League players
Soviet Top League players
FC Dynamo Kyiv players
FC Chornomorets Odesa players
Budapesti VSC footballers
Csepel SC footballers
SC Odesa players
FC Zorya Luhansk players
FC Kremin Kremenchuk players
Association football forwards
FC Nosta Novotroitsk players
Soviet expatriate sportspeople in Hungary
Ukrainian expatriate sportspeople in Finland